Triple Door may refer to:

Triple Door, a novel by Chinese writer Han Han
The Triple Door, a dinner theater, lounge and music venue in Seattle, Washington